The RG Heidelberg (literally "Heidelberg Rowing Club") is a German rugby union club from Heidelberg, currently playing in the Rugby-Bundesliga. Apart from rugby, the club also offers the sport of rowing.

History
The club was formed on 4 June 1898 as a rowing club. Out of necessity to have an alternative sport in winter, frozen rivers made rowing naturally impossible, the rugby department of the club was formed in 1919.

The RGH was the third rugby club to be formed in Heidelberg, after the Heidelberger RK and the SC Neuenheim, making it easy for the new team to find opposition to play against. The SC 1880 Frankfurt and the rugby department of the VfB Stuttgart were also teams the club played in its early years.

Due to many South Africans who were studying in Heidelberg, the club developed a good relationship with Dutch teams and eventually, the Dutch national colours, orange, became RGH's team colours, which they still are today.

In 1930, the club played in its first German rugby union championship final but lost to SV Odin Hannover 0-13. In 1932, 1933, 1937 and 1938 the RGH made four more losing appearances in the German championship final.

In 1959, the club appeared in another final, losing once more but in 1967 it finally won its first national title, winning the German rugby union cup. After another finals defeat in 1970 and the introduction of the Rugby-Bundesliga in 1971, the club formed its very successful youth department in 1972.

In 1980, the team finally won its first German title, followed by another three in 1997, 2006 and 2007. The 2006 final, the 86th in the competition's history, produced a novelty in the history of the game in Germany, with RGH and SC Neuenheim two clubs from Heidelberg competed for the title, for the first time. It was also the first time that no club from Hannover stood in the final.

In 1996, the club moved to its current home ground, the Fritz-Grunebaum-Sportpark.

While the club managed to upset SC 1880 Frankfurt in the 2007 German final, a repeat in the following season was not possible and the favorites from Frankfurt took out the title that year. After this, the club was unable to advance past the semi-final stage of the German championship.

On 22 August 2011, five days before the start of the season, the club withdrew its reserve team from the 2nd Rugby-Bundesliga South/West, citing inability to guarantee a full player squad for the whole season. Shortly after, the club announced that the team would instead compete in the tier-three 3rd Liga South/West in 2011-12.

RGH finished first in their group in the 2012-13 season and qualified for the south/west division of the championship round, where it also came first. The club advanced to the semi finals of the play-offs where it was knocked out by SC Neuenheim, losing 18–32. In 2013–14 the team qualified for the championship and the play-offs once more, defeating TSV Victoria Linden 101–10 in the first round and losing to Berliner Rugby Club in the quarter finals.

In the 2014–15 season the club finished fourth in the south-west championship group and was knocked out by Heidelberger RK in the semi finals of the play-offs after victories over FC St. Pauli Rugby and RK 03 Berlin.

 RG Heidelberg was the only club to have belonged to the Rugby-Bundesliga in every season since its interception.

On 20 July 2017, Prince William, Duke of Cambridge and Catherine, Duchess of Cambridge took the role of coxswains to race using RG Heidelberg boats from the Old Bridge in Heidelberg and the Theodor-Heuss Bridge (de).

Club honours
 German rugby union championship
 Champions: 1980, 1997, 2006, 2007
 Runners up: 1930, 1932, 1933, 1937, 1938, 1959, 1970, 1982, 1983, 1996, 1999, 2008
 German rugby union cup
 Winner: 1967, 1986, 1995, 1997, 2004
 Runners up: 1974, 1975, 1977, 1980, 1982, 1990, 1996, 2006, 2007, 2008
 German sevens championship
 Champions: 1997, 1998, 1999, 2003, 2005, 2008, 2009, 2015, 2016
 Runners up: 1996, 2000, 2004, 2007, 2011

Recent seasons
Recent seasons of the club:

Men: First team

 Until 2001, when the single-division Bundesliga was established, the season was divided in autumn and spring, a Vorrunde and Endrunde, whereby the top teams of the Rugby-Bundesliga would play out the championship while the bottom teams together with the autumn 2nd Bundesliga champion would play for Bundesliga qualification. The remainder of the 2nd Bundesliga teams would play a spring round to determine the relegated clubs. Where two placing's are shown, the first is autumn, the second spring. In 2012 the Bundesliga was expanded from ten to 24 teams and the 2nd Bundesliga from 20 to 24  with the leagues divided into four regional divisions.

Men: Reserve team

Rugby internationals

Mathias Entenmann, a lock and back rower, played 26 times for his country.

The former England international Phil Christophers who made his debut in 2002 started his rugby career with RG Heidelberg, being the son of a German mother and English father.

In Germany's 2006–08 European Nations Cup campaign, Mustafa Güngör, Christopher Weselek, Edmoore Takaendesa, Tim Coly, Manuel Wilhelm, Sebastian Werle, Kehoma Brenner, Tim Kasten and Steffen Thier were called up for the national team while being on the club's roster.

In the 2008–10 campaign, Güngör, Weselek, Takaendesa, Coly, Wilhelm and Brenner all appeared for the RGH and Germany again, while Pierre Faber and Fabian Heimpel were new additions to the club's list of internationals.

In the 2010–12 campaign, Manuel Wilhelm, Mustafa Güngör, Tim Coly and Fabian Heimpel were re-selected for Germany, with Güngör leaving RGH at the end of the 2010-11 season, while Bastian Himmer was a new selection.

For the opening match of the 2012–14 edition of the ENC against the Ukraine the club had only Manuel Wilhelm selected for the team.

The club had six players selected for the German under-18 team at the 2009 European Under-18 Rugby Union Championship, these being Elmar Heimpel, Nicolas Kurzer, Bastian Himmer, Robert Hittel, Luis Becker and Raffael Ruck . Of these, Elmar Heimpel, Luis Becker and Robert Hittel also played at the 2010 tournament, as did Nicolas Kurzer, who was then with the Heidelberger TV.

With Marvin Dieckmann, Robert Haase, Fabian Heimpel, Bastian Himmer, Tim Lichtenberg, Robin Plümpe as well as Johannes and Simon Schreieck, the club currently has 8 players in the German national Rugby 7s squad. Dieckmann also made his international debut in XV Rugby for Germany in his sides´24-21 win over Uruguay in November 2016.

Out of RGH´s current Bundesliga squad Antony Dickinson, Elmar Heimpel, Christian Hug, Carsten Lang and Florian Wehrspann have already featured in the national 7s Rugby side or are part of the German XV Development Squad.

Coaches
Recent coaches of the club:

References

External links
  Official website
  RG Heidelberg team info at totalrugby.de
  Tables and results of the German rugby union leagues

German rugby union clubs
Rugby clubs established in 1898
Rugby union in Heidelberg
1898 establishments in Germany